Quesnelia imbricata is a species of flowering plant in the family Bromeliaceae, endemic to Brazil (the states of Paraná and Santa Catarina). It was first described by Lyman Bradford Smith in 1952. It is found in the Atlantic Forest ecoregion of southeastern Brazil.

See also

References

imbricata
Endemic flora of Brazil
Flora of the Atlantic Forest
Flora of Paraná (state)
Flora of Santa Catarina (state)
Plants described in 1952